Ruby Spowart (born 1928) is an Australian photographer whose award-winning images of outback landscapes are based on some 40 safari tours in Australia and New Zealand. Ruby is a triple Master of Photography, Fellow and Honorary Fellow of the Australian Institute of Professional Photography. She also achieved a Certificate in Art from the Queensland College of Art as well as an Associate Diploma of Visual Art from Queensland University of Technology. Co-founder of the Brisbane Imagery Gallery in 1982, she exhibited there until 1995. From Polaroid colour photograms in the 1980s to large-scale photo mosaics in the 1990s and photobooks since 2000, she has created a considerable body of work. Spowart is a Fellow of the Australian Institute of Professional Photographers (AIPP).

In March 2009, Spowart was one of six Australian female photographers who were celebrated by the AIPP. The others were Bronwyn Kidd, Kate Geraghty, Karen Gowlett-Holmes, Lyn Whitfield-King and Jackie Ranken.

Work 
Spowart has created an immense body of work in the following techniques: Polaroid 10”x8” colour photograms (1980s), polaroid SX-70 multi-image (joiner-style works) (1980s), massive pseudo-panorama landscapes (1980s & 90s), camera toss mosaics  (1980s & 90s), large-scale photo mosaics  (1980s & 90s), artists’ books and photobooks (2000–2012)

Some of Spowart’s work from the AIPP APP Awards success are her most famous, particularly her work with Kodak High Speed Infrared film and Leica M2. Many of the images are of outback Australian landscapes and are mainly sepia toned. Many of her photographs were printed by her son, Doug Spowart. During her career, Spowart has won many awards including several from the McGregor Prize for Photography.

Publications

See also 
 Photography in Australia
 Cinema of Australia
 John Watt Beattie
 William Bland
 Jeff Carter (photographer)
 Maggie Diaz
 Ken G. Hall
 Charles Kerry
 Henry King (photographer)
 David Perry (Australian filmmaker)
 Mark Strizic

References 

1928 births
Living people
Australian photographers
Landscape photographers
Australian women photographers
People from Brisbane
20th-century Australian photographers
20th-century Australian women artists
Queensland College of Art alumni
Queensland University of Technology alumni
20th-century women photographers